Mount Jackson is a hill in outback Western Australia located at .  It is situated  NNW of Koolyanobbing and  NNE of Southern Cross.  It is in the Shire of Yilgarn.

Prospectors James Speakman and William Hall discovered gold there in January 1894.

As of 2008, the  site was being mined for iron ore by Cliffs Asia Pacific Iron Ore Pty Ltd, a subsidiary of Cliffs Natural Resources of Cleveland, Ohio. Ore is trucked to Koolyanobbing via a haul road and then by rail to port at Esperance for export.  The mine has an expected life of 10 years and the operators expect to remove approximately 33 million tonnes of iron ore from two pits.

The mine is part of Cliff's Koolyanobbing Iron Ore Project which includes mines at Mount Jackson, Koolyanobbing and Windarling ( further north).  It was established for ironstone mining from about 2003 by Portman Limited.  Portman was acquired by Cliffs Natural Resources Limited in January 2009.

Mt Jackson is a cattle station that has mining operations. mt Jackson hill has been mined through nearest town is bullfinch if you call it a town but southern cross is the center of the ylgarn which mt Jackson is a part of the ylgarn the main roads in mt Jackson in the mt Jackson road and the bullfinch Evanston road.

References

External links

Photos of Mount Jackson from Panoramio
Mineralogy details

Iron ore mines in Western Australia
Goldfields-Esperance
Mountains of Western Australia
Shire of Yilgarn